Kevin Barkley Eboña (born November 29, 1996) is a Filipino basketball player for the Converge FiberXers of the Philippine Basketball Association (PBA). He was drafted 4th overall pick in the 1st round of the 2019 PBA draft.

Professional career
Eboña was drafted fourth overall by the Alaska Aces during the 2019 PBA draft.

On October 13, 2021, Eboña, along with JVee Casio, was traded to the Blackwater Bossing for Mike Tolomia and a 2022 second-round pick. On December 30, Eboña signed a two-year contract extension with the Bossing.

On January 3, 2023, Eboña, along with a 2022 first-round pick, was traded to the Converge FiberXers for Michael DiGregorio, Tyrus Hill and RK Ilagan.

PBA career statistics

As of the end of 2022–23 season

Season-by-season averages

|-
| align=left | 
| align=left | Alaska
| 12 || 18.4 || .593 || .000 || .636 || 3.3 || .9 || .5 || .5 || 7.0
|-
| align=left rowspan=2| 
| align=left | Alaska
| rowspan=2|17 || rowspan=2|18.3 || rowspan=2|.447 || rowspan=2|.000 || rowspan=2|.614 || rowspan=2|4.4 || rowspan=2|.8 || rowspan=2|.4 || rowspan=2|.2 || rowspan=2|5.6
|-
| align=left | Blackwater
|-
| align=left rowspan=2| 
| align=left | Blackwater
| rowspan=2|31 || rowspan=2|13.6 || rowspan=2|.381 || rowspan=2|.375 || rowspan=2|.476 || rowspan=2|2.9 || rowspan=2|.6 || rowspan=2|.2 || rowspan=2|.4 || rowspan=2|3.0
|-
| align=left | Converge
|- class="sortbottom"
| style="text-align:center;" colspan="2"|Career
| 60 || 15.9 || .454 || .188 || .586 || 3.4 || .7 || .3 || .4 || 4.5

References 

1997 births
Living people
Alaska Aces (PBA) draft picks
Alaska Aces (PBA) players
Basketball players from Cebu
Blackwater Bossing players
Centers (basketball)
Converge FiberXers players
FEU Tamaraws basketball players
Filipino men's basketball players
Power forwards (basketball)
Sportspeople from Cebu City